Khangoi (Khunggoi) is a Sino-Tibetan language of the Tangkhulic branch. The dialect of the namesake Khangoi village is quite similar to what Brown (1837) labeled 'Northern' and 'Central' Tangkhul, labels which don't match current geographical descriptions.

References

Tangkhulic languages
Languages of Manipur
Languages of Nagaland